Aleksandr Dedushkin (born 1981 in Ulyanovsk, Russia) is a Russian professional basketball player. He is a center. He is 2.07 m (6 ft 9 ½ in) in height and 120 kg (265 pounds) in weight.

Professional career
He has played with the pro clubs Khimki BC, Spartak Saint Petersburg, Ural Great, Proteas EKA AEL and BC Krasnye Krylia.

External links
 FIBAEurope.com Dedushkin with Ural Great

Living people
1981 births
Russian men's basketball players
AEL Limassol B.C. players
BC Khimki players
BC Krasnye Krylia players
BC Spartak Saint Petersburg players
PBC Ural Great players
BC UNICS players
Centers (basketball)